= Holmberg Mechanical =

Holmberg Company
- Type: Private
- Industry: Mechanical contracting
- Founded: c. 1948
- Key people: Jeff White (President & CEO)
- Number of employees: 250
- Website: holmbergco.com

Holmberg (also known as Holmberg Mechanical) is a mechanical contracting firm based in Bellevue, Washington, United States. The company provides plumbing, pipefitting, HVAC, sheet metal, refrigeration, and fabrication services for commercial and public infrastructure projects.

== History ==
Holmberg was established around 1949 by Arne Holmberg as Holmberg Plumbing. It is one of the oldest union full-service mechanical companies in Washington state.

During the 60s and 70s, the company expanded to deliver its services across Washington State. Arne's son, Pher Holmberg, took over in the 80s.

Jeff White purchased the company from Arne's son, Pher Holmberg, in 2007. In 2010, he renamed the company Holmberg Mechanical following the expansion of the company's services to include HVAC, plumbing, and engineering services.

The company was listed among Inc.5000 fastest growing companies in 2019 and 2020.

In 2021, Holmberg Mechanical was featured on the television program World’s Greatest. The segment aired on Bloomberg TV and highlighted Holmberg's ongoing work on projects such as Avenue Bellevue, Spire, and the East Link light rail expansion. In June 2021 Holmberg was awarded a $6.5 million contract for mechanical work on an open tunnel station as part of the East Link light rail expansion. The station is designed to handle projected ridership of up to 52,000 daily and improve transit access across the Puget Sound region.

In 2022, Holmberg moved into a new 30,000-square-foot headquarters and fabrication facility in Bellevue.

== Operations ==
Holmberg provides services that include engineering, design, installation, and maintenance of mechanical systems. It also operates its own fabrication facility. The firm's preconstruction services focus on early project planning, risk reduction, and cost evaluation. Holmberg also manages service and maintenance agreements, including retrofits and emergency repairs, through a dedicated service division.

Holmberg's areas of operation include design-build and engineering, preconstruction, plumbing and pipefitting, installation of potable water systems, drainage, gas, geothermal, hydronic, medical gas, and other commercial piping systems, HVAC, fabrication (off-site manufacturing of HVAC ductwork, piping skid packages, and boiler plants, special projects (tenant improvements, building retrofits, and upgrades in occupied or sensitive environments) and detailing and BIM/VDC (3D coordination drawings and clash detection prior to construction.)

Jeff White is the president and CEO of the company.

=== Selected projects ===
The company has completed more than 7,000 projects, including:

- citizenM Pioneer Square – A 216-room hotel in Seattle.
- East Link Light Rail Tunnel, Bellevue – The station is designed to handle projected ridership of up to 52,000 daily and improve transit access across the Puget Sound region.
- Ferry terminal at Colman Dock – reconstruction of Seattle's Colman Dock.

== Public activities ==
Holmberg Mechanical supports many local charities and nonprofit organizations, focusing on causes that uplift veterans, underserved communities, and individuals with accessibility needs. The company contributes both financially and through hands-on volunteering, including initiatives like Mission Outdoors, Rampathon, and the Seattle Block Project.

In 2018, Holmberg Mechanical partnered with Rebuilding Together Seattle, a nonprofit organization that provides free home repairs for low-income families. In 2021, Holmberg participated in community-oriented construction initiatives in partnership with Construction for Change (CfC) and the Sheet Metal and Air Conditioning Contractors’ National Association of Western Washington (SMACNA-WW). The company contributed to the construction of a 30-unit Pallet Shelter community in Everett, Washington, providing temporary housing for individuals experiencing homelessness. Holmberg Mechanical team also contributed to volunteer-led humanitarian efforts through Plumbers Without Borders Seattle Block Project.
