= World's Greatest (TV program) =

Television show

World’s Greatest is an American-made edutainment program that has been airing on national television in the United States of America for the last 18 years. Originally available on the ION Network, World’s Greatest has been airing on the Bloomberg Network since 2021. The show has featured some of the largest brands and businesses in the world, including P&G, Dollar General, Crest Toothpaste, Budweiser, 3M, and Samsung. However, it also includes small businesses. Produced by How 2 Media, World’s Greatest is currently airing its 19th season and has aired over 250 episodes to date.

== Episodes ==
| Season | Episode | Air Date |
Season 1
| 1 | Episode 1 | July 9, 2007 |
| 1 | Episode 2 | August 6, 2007 |
| 1 | Episode 3 | September 3, 2007 |
| 1 | Episode 4 | October 15, 2007 |
| 1 | Episode 5 | November 12, 2007 |
| 1 | Episode 6 | December 3, 2007 |
Season 2
| 2 | Episode 1 | January 7, 2008 |
| 2 | Episode 2 | February 4, 2008 |
| 2 | Episode 3 | March 10, 2008 |
| 2 | Episode 4 | April 7, 2008 |
| 2 | Episode 5 | May 12, 2008 |
| 2 | Episode 6 | June 9, 2008 |
| 2 | Episode 7 | July 7, 2008 |
| 2 | Episode 8 | August 11, 2008 |
| 2 | Episode 9 | September 8, 2008 |
| 2 | Episode 10 | October 13, 2008 |
| 2 | Episode 11 | November 10, 2008 |
| 2 | Episode 12 | December 15, 2008 |
Season 3
| 3 | Episode 1 | January 12, 2009 |
| 3 | Episode 2 | February 9, 2009 |
| 3 | Episode 3 | March 9, 2009 |
| 3 | Episode 4 | April 6, 2009 |
| 3 | Episode 5 | May 4, 2009 |
| 3 | Episode 6 | June 8, 2009 |
| 3 | Episode 7 | July 13, 2009 |
| 3 | Episode 8 | August 10, 2009 |
| 3 | Episode 9 | September 7, 2009 |
| 3 | Episode 10 | October 12, 2009 |
| 3 | Episode 11 | November 9, 2009 |
| 3 | Episode 12 | December 7, 2009 |
Season 4
| 4 | Episode 1 | January 4, 2010 |
| 4 | Episode 2 | February 8, 2010 |
| 4 | Episode 3 | March 8, 2010 |
| 4 | Episode 4 | April 12, 2010 |
| 4 | Episode 5 | May 3, 2010 |
| 4 | Episode 6 | June 7, 2010 |
| 4 | Episode 7 | July 12, 2010 |
| 4 | Episode 8 | August 9, 2010 |
| 4 | Episode 9 | September 6, 2010 |
| 4 | Episode 10 | October 4, 2010 |
| 4 | Episode 11 | November 15, 2010 |
| 4 | Episode 12 | December 13, 2010 |
Season 5
| 5 | Episode 1 | January 10, 2011 |
| 5 | Episode 2 | February 7, 2011 |
| 5 | Episode 3 | March 7, 2011 |
| 5 | Episode 4 | April 11, 2011 |
| 5 | Episode 5 | May 9, 2011 |
| 5 | Episode 6 | June 6, 2011 |
| 5 | Episode 7 | July 11, 2011 |
| 5 | Episode 8 | August 8, 2011 |
| 5 | Episode 9 | September 5, 2011 |
| 5 | Episode 10 | October 10, 2011 |
| 5 | Episode 11 | November 14, 2011 |
| 5 | Episode 12 | December 12, 2011 |
Season 6
| 6 | Episode 1 | January 9, 2012 |
| 6 | Episode 2 | January 10, 2012 |
| 6 | Episode 3 | February 6, 2012 |
| 6 | Episode 4 | February 27, 2012 |
| 6 | Episode 5 | March 19, 2012 |
| 6 | Episode 6 | April 9, 2012 |
| 6 | Episode 7 | April 30, 2012 |
| 6 | Episode 8 | May 21, 2012 |
| 6 | Episode 9 | June 11, 2012 |
| 6 | Episode 10 | July 2, 2012 |
| 6 | Episode 11 | July 23, 2012 |
| 6 | Episode 12 | August 13, 2012 |
| 6 | Episode 13 | September 3, 2012 |
| 6 | Episode 14 | September 24, 2012 |
| 6 | Episode 15 | October 15, 2012 |
| 6 | Episode 16 | November 5, 2012 |
| 6 | Episode 17 | November 19, 2012 |
| 6 | Episode 18 | November 26, 2012 |
| 6 | Episode 19 | December 17, 2012 |
Season 7
| 7 | Episode 1 | January 14, 2013 |
| 7 | Episode 2 | February 4, 2013 |
| 7 | Episode 3 | February 18, 2013 |
| 7 | Episode 4 | March 4, 2013 |
| 7 | Episode 5 | March 18, 2013 |
| 7 | Episode 6 | April 3, 2013 |
| 7 | Episode 7 | April 24, 2013 |
| 7 | Episode 8 | May 13, 2013 |
| 7 | Episode 9 | June 3, 2013 |
| 7 | Episode 10 | June 24, 2013 |
| 7 | Episode 11 | July 22, 2013 |
| 7 | Episode 12 | August 5, 2013 |
| 7 | Episode 13 | August 26, 2013 |
| 7 | Episode 14 | September 9, 2013 |
| 7 | Episode 15 | September 23, 2013 |
| 7 | Episode 16 | October 14, 2013 |
| 7 | Episode 17 | November 4, 2013 |
| 7 | Episode 18 | November 18, 2013 |
| 7 | Episode 19 | December 16, 2013 |
| 7 | Episode 20 | December 30, 2013 |
Season 8
| 8 | Episode 1 | February 3, 2014 |
| 8 | Episode 2 | February 17, 2014 |
| 8 | Episode 3 | March 10, 2014 |
| 8 | Episode 4 | March 31, 2014 |
| 8 | Episode 5 | April 21, 2014 |
| 8 | Episode 6 | May 19, 2014 |
| 8 | Episode 7 | June 9, 2014 |
| 8 | Episode 8 | June 30, 2014 |
| 8 | Episode 9 | July 14, 2014 |
| 8 | Episode 10 | August 11, 2014 |
| 8 | Episode 11 | September 8, 2014 |
| 8 | Episode 12 | September 29, 2014 |
| 8 | Episode 13 | October 20, 2014 |
| 8 | Episode 14 | November 24, 2014 |
| 8 | Episode 15 | December 29, 2014 |
Season 9
| 9 | Episode 1 | February 2, 2015 |
| 9 | Episode 2 | March 9, 2015 |
| 9 | Episode 3 | March 30, 2015 |
| 9 | Episode 4 | April 20, 2015 |
| 9 | Episode 5 | May 18, 2015 |
| 9 | Episode 6 | June 15, 2015 |
| 9 | Episode 7 | July 27, 2015 |
| 9 | Episode 8 | August 17, 2015 |
| 9 | Episode 9 | September 7, 2015 |
| 9 | Episode 10 | September 28, 2015 |
| 9 | Episode 11 | October 19, 2015 |
| 9 | Episode 12 | November 16, 2015 |
| 9 | Episode 13 | December 7, 2015 |
Season 10
| 10 | Episode 1 | January 4, 2016 |
| 10 | Episode 2 | February 1, 2016 |
| 10 | Episode 3 | February 22, 2016 |
| 10 | Episode 4 | March 14, 2016 |
| 10 | Episode 5 | April 4, 2016 |
| 10 | Episode 6 | April 18, 2016 |
| 10 | Episode 7 | May 23, 2016 |
| 10 | Episode 8 | June 13, 2016 |
| 10 | Episode 9 | July 4, 2016 |
| 10 | Episode 10 | August 1, 2016 |
| 10 | Episode 11 | August 22, 2016 |
| 10 | Episode 12 | September 5, 2016 |
| 10 | Episode 13 | September 26, 2016 |
| 10 | Episode 14 | October 17, 2016 |
| 10 | Episode 15 | November 14, 2016 |
| 10 | Episode 16 | December 12, 2016 |
Season 11
| 11 | Episode 1 | January 9, 2017 |
| 11 | Episode 2 | February 6, 2017 |
| 11 | Episode 3 | March 6, 2017 |
| 11 | Episode 4 | March 27, 2017 |
| 11 | Episode 5 | April 24, 2017 |
| 11 | Episode 6 | May 22, 2017 |
| 11 | Episode 7 | June 5, 2017 |
| 11 | Episode 8 | June 26, 2017 |
| 11 | Episode 9 | July 17, 2017 |
| 11 | Episode 10 | September 18, 2017 |
| 11 | Episode 11 | October 18, 2017 |
| 11 | Episode 12 | October 16, 2017 |
| 11 | Episode 13 | November 13, 2017 |
| 11 | Episode 14 | December 11, 2017 |
Season 12
| 12 | Episode 1 | January 8, 2018 |
| 12 | Episode 2 | February 13, 2018 |
| 12 | Episode 3 | February 26, 2018 |
| 12 | Episode 4 | March 19, 2018 |
| 12 | Episode 5 | April 13, 2018 |
| 12 | Episode 6 | May 7, 2018 |
| 12 | Episode 7 | May 28, 2018 |
| 12 | Episode 8 | June 25, 2018 |
| 12 | Episode 9 | July 23, 2018 |
| 12 | Episode 10 | August 6, 2018 |
| 12 | Episode 11 | September 10, 2018 |
| 12 | Episode 12 | October 8, 2018 |
| 12 | Episode 13 | October 29, 2018 |
| 12 | Episode 14 | November 19, 2018 |
| 12 | Episode 15 | December 10, 2018 |
Season 13
| 13 | Episode 1 | January 7, 2019 |
| 13 | Episode 2 | January 21, 2019 |
| 13 | Episode 3 | February 4, 2019 |
| 13 | Episode 4 | February 25, 2019 |
| 13 | Episode 5 | March 18, 2019 |
| 13 | Episode 6 | April 15, 2019 |
| 13 | Episode 7 | May 6, 2019 |
| 13 | Episode 8 | June 3, 2019 |
| 13 | Episode 9 | July 1, 2019 |
| 13 | Episode 10 | July 22, 2019 |
| 13 | Episode 11 | August 19, 2019 |
| 13 | Episode 12 | September 9, 2019 |
| 13 | Episode 13 | September 30, 2019 |
| 13 | Episode 14 | October 21, 2019 |
| 13 | Episode 15 | November 4, 2019 |
| 13 | Episode 16 | November 25, 2019 |
| 13 | Episode 17 | December 23, 2019 |
Season 14
| 14 | Episode 1 | January 20, 2020 |
| 14 | Episode 2 | February 17, 2020 |
| 14 | Episode 3 | March 16, 2020 |
| 14 | Episode 4 | April 6, 2020 |
| 14 | Episode 5 | April 27, 2020 |
| 14 | Episode 6 | May 25, 2020 |
| 14 | Episode 7 | June 29, 2020 |
| 14 | Episode 8 | August 17, 2020 |
| 14 | Episode 9 | September 21, 2020 |
| 14 | Episode 10 | November 1, 2020 |
| 14 | Episode 11 | November 23, 2020 |
| 14 | Episode 12 | December 21, 2020 |
Season 15
| 15 | Episode 1 | January 11, 2021 |
| 15 | Episode 2 | February 8, 2021 |
| 15 | Episode 3 | March 1, 2021 |
| 15 | Episode 4 | March 28, 2021 |
| 15 | Episode 5 | April 23, 2021 |
| 15 | Episode 6 | May 15, 2021 |
| 15 | Episode 7 | June 5, 2021 |
| 15 | Episode 8 | June 19, 2021 |
| 15 | Episode 9 | July 10, 2021 |
| 15 | Episode 10 | July 31, 2021 |
| 15 | Episode 11 | August 14, 2021 |
| 15 | Episode 12 | September 4, 2021 |
| 15 | Episode 13 | September 18, 2021 |
| 15 | Episode 14 | October 9, 2021 |
| 15 | Episode 15 | October 30, 2021 |
| 15 | Episode 16 | November 13, 2021 |
| 15 | Episode 17 | December 4, 2021 |
| 15 | Episode 18 | December 25, 2021 |
Season 16
| 16 | Episode 1 | January 22, 2022 |
| 16 | Episode 2 | February 12, 2022 |
| 16 | Episode 3 | March 5, 2022 |
| 16 | Episode 4 | March 26, 2022 |
| 16 | Episode 5 | April 16, 2022 |
| 16 | Episode 6 | April 30, 2022 |
| 16 | Episode 7 | May 14, 2022 |
| 16 | Episode 8 | June 4, 2022 |
| 16 | Episode 9 | June 18, 2022 |
| 16 | Episode 10 | July 9, 2022 |
| 16 | Episode 11 | August 16, 2022 |
| 16 | Episode 12 | August 13, 2022 |
| 16 | Episode 13 | September 3, 2022 |
| 16 | Episode 14 | September 17, 2022 |
| 16 | Episode 15 | October 8, 2022 |
| 16 | Episode 16 | October 22, 2022 |
| 16 | Episode 17 | November 12, 2022 |
| 16 | Episode 18 | December 3, 2022 |
| 16 | Episode 19 | December 17, 2022 |
| 16 | Episode 20 | December 31, 2022 |
Season 17
| 17 | Episode 1 | February 5, 2023 |
| 17 | Episode 2 | February 26, 2023 |
| 17 | Episode 3 | March 2023 |
| 17 | Episode 4 | March 26, 2023 |
| 17 | Episode 5 | April 16, 2023 |
| 17 | Episode 6 | May 7, 2023 |
| 17 | Episode 7 | May 28, 2023 |
| 17 | Episode 8 | June 11, 2023 |
| 17 | Episode 9 | June 2023 |
| 17 | Episode 10 | July 9, 2023 |
| 17 | Episode 11 | July 23, 2023 |
| 17 | Episode 12 | August 6, 2023 |
| 17 | Episode 13 | August 20, 2023 |
| 17 | Episode 14 | September 2, 2023 |
| 17 | Episode 15 | September 16, 2023 |
| 17 | Episode 16 | September 16, 2023 |
| 17 | Episode 17 | September 30, 2023 |
Season 18
| 18 | Episode 1 | October 14, 2023 |
| 18 | Episode 2 | October 28, 2023 |
| 18 | Episode 3 | November 11, 2023 |
| 18 | Episode 4 | November 11, 2023 |
| 18 | Episode 5 | November 25, 2023 |
| 18 | Episode 6 | December 9, 2023 |
| 18 | Episode 7 | December 9, 2023 |
| 18 | Episode 8 | December 23, 2023 |
Season 19
| 19 | Episode 1 | January 13, 2024 |
| 19 | Episode 2 | January 27, 2024 |
| 19 | Episode 3 | February 17, 2024 |
| 19 | Episode 4 | March 9, 2024 |
| 19 | Episode 5 | March 30, 2024 |
| 19 | Episode 6 | April 27, 2024 |
